Robert Huddleston Wiebe (22 April 1930 – 10 December 2000) was an American historian and bestselling author. He specialized in American business history.

Life 
He was born on 22 April 1930 to Richard Wiebe and Jean Huddleston Wiebe in Amarillo, Texas. He graduated from Peoria High School in 1948 and Carleton College in 1951. In 1957, he received his PhD from the University of Rochester.  He married Allene Davis with whom he had three sons. He taught briefly at Michigan State University and Columbia University. and for most of his career at Northwestern University. He died on 10 December 2000 in Evanston, Illinois.

In 1981, he received the Guggenheim Fellowship. He also served as the Pitt Professor of American History and Institutions. He was a member of the American Historical Association (AHA) and the Organization of American Historians (OAH).

Bibliography 

His books have received mostly positive reviews. Some of his notable publications are:
 "Business disunity and the progressive movement, 1901-1914." Mississippi Valley Historical Review 44.4 (1958): 664-685. online

 "The House of Morgan and the Executive, 1905-1913." American Historical Review 65.1 (1959): 49-60. online

 "The anthracite strike of 1902: A record of confusion." Mississippi Valley Historical Review 48.2 (1961): 229-251. online

 Businessmen and Reform: A Study of the Progressive Movement (1962)
 The Search for Order, 1877–1920 (1967)
 "The social functions of public education." American Quarterly 21.2 (1969): 147-164. online

 The Segmented Society: An Introduction to the Meaning of America (1975)
 The Opening of American Society: From the Adoption of the Constitution to the Eve of Disunion (1984)
 Self-Rule: A Cultural History of American Democracy (1995)
 Who We Are: A History of Popular Nationalism (2002)

References

External links

1930 births
2000 deaths
20th-century American historians
American male non-fiction writers
Carleton College alumni
University of Rochester alumni
20th-century American male writers